Frank Gardner OAM (1 October 1931 – 29 August 2009) was a racing driver from Australia. Born in Sydney, he was best known for touring car racing, winning the British Saloon Car Championship three times, and sports car racing driver but he was also a top flight open wheeler driver.  He was European Formula 5000 champion, and participated in nine World Championship Formula One Grands Prix, debuting on 11 July 1964. He scored no championship points. Gardner also participated in numerous non-Championship Formula One races and his results included a third placing at the 1965 Mediterranean Grand Prix at the Autodromo di Pergusa in Sicily, fourth in the 1965 Race of Champions at Brands Hatch and third in the 1971 International Gold Cup at Oulton Park.  He participated each year in the open wheeler Tasman Series held in New Zealand and Australia during the European winter, and shared the grids with the likes of Jim Clark, Graham Hill and Jochen Rindt and won the New Zealand Grand Prix.

He is unrelated to the former Grand Prix motorcycle and touring car racer Wayne Gardner.

Frank was an Australian champion surf boat rower in 1953, rowing for Whale Beach Surf Life Saving Club. The coach was Jack Uren, brother of politician Tom Uren.

Career
Gardner was born in 1931, not 1930 as is often quoted. He changed his date of birth on documents which permitted the under-age Gardner to gain a racing licence.  He sailed to England late in 1958 following his ownership of a Mobilgas service station in Avalon on Sydney's northern beaches, and a successful career driving Jaguar XK120s, a C-Type (XKC037) and D-Type (XKD520). Both latter cars were insurance write-offs and repaired by Gardner and his friends.

Unlike most racing drivers, Gardner was born into a very poor family. His father moved the large family to Ulladulla on the south coast of New South Wales where he was a fisherman. When his father was killed after being hit by a drunk driver, Gardner went to live with his unmarried uncle Hope Bartlett – a legend in Australia and New Zealand as a racing driver and golfer.

Bartlett put Gardner under his guidance and brought him up to be an automotive engineer. Gardner always preferred engineering cars to driving, and went to England to join Jaguar, but disliked the Midlands in the middle of winter. Subsequently, he joined Aston Martin as a racing mechanic.

He was a member of the team which won Le Mans in 1959. Gardner told team boss John Wyer he needed to run a Colotti gearbox. Wyer was affronted by the young 'colonial', but swapped the gearbox on one of the cars – and it won – while the other broke down.

He joined the Jim Russell Driving School where he prepared the cars, then became the 'star pupil driver' because he was unknown in England as a driver. He was later the first person employed by Jack Brabham in the new MRD F1 racing team — soon to become Brabham.

In 1966 Gardner finished second in the 1000 km Spa round of the International Manufacturers Championship. In  he also finished second in the European Trophy for Formula 2 Drivers and second in the British Autocar Formula Two Championship. In 1970 he was fourth in the European Formula 5000 Championship and then won the championship the following year.

He won his class at Le Mans in 1961 sharing a works Lotus Elite with David Hobbs.

Gardner also travelled to the United States and drove in the Sports Car Club of America's newly established Trans-Am Series in 1966, finishing the last race of the inaugural season at the Riverside International Raceway 4 hour race in 4th place outright and winning the Under 2L division driving a Lotus Cortina. Gardner was among a number of Australians who drove in the early years of the Trans-Am, including Allan Moffat, Harry Firth and Horst Kwech. In 1968 he had his first and only NASCAR start at Rockingham driving a Ford.

In the late 1960s and early 1970s, Gardner had two second-place finishes in the Australian Grand Prix – in 1966 at Lakeside behind Graham Hill and 1972 at Sandown behind Graham McRae. In between there was a third in 1967 at Warwick Farm in his home town of Sydney behind British Formula One champion Jim Clark and future champion Jackie Stewart. He drove a works Brabham at the Oulton Park Gold Cup in 1967.

Gardner finished third in the 1967 and 1972 Tasman Series. He won the British Saloon Car Championship title on three occasions, 1967 (Ford Falcon Sprint), 1968 (Ford Cortina Lotus & Ford Escort) and 1973 (Chevrolet Camaro), and was runner-up in 1970 (Ford Mustang Boss 302). In 1975 he finished second in the Hardie-Ferodo 1000 at Bathurst with Bob Morris in a Holden Torana SL/R 5000 L34.

Gardner won the 1972 New Zealand Grand Prix, which was run under Tasman Formula regulations (which incorporated Formula 5000 cars) and was the first round of the 1972 Tasman Series, at Pukekohe driving a Lola T300-Chevrolet.  He was extremely proud of winning the New Zealand title because Bartlett had won it in the 1930s.

Return to Australia

After returning full-time to Australia in the mid-1970s Gardner won the 1977 Australian Sports Sedan Championship driving a highly modified Chevrolet Corvair. That championship victory led into a team management role when he retired from full-time driving. After running the Allan Grice Touring Car and Sports Sedan team in the late 70s, it rolled into a factory touring car preparation for BMW in the Australian Touring Car Championship, a team he would run from the programs toe in the water inception with a BMW 318i turbo Sports Sedan in 1980 all the way until 1987 when Gardner decided to retire from motorsport and close the JPS Team BMW after allegedly becoming fed up with the politics involved after his protest against the Eggenberger Motorsport Ford Sierra RS500s at the 1987 James Hardie 1000 which had become a round of the inaugural World Touring Car Championship. However, when asked about this in 1988, Gardner dismissed the notion saying instead that he had been unwell and simply needed a break.

Gardner's last competitive drive was to be as co-driver with JPS Team lead driver Jim Richards in the team's Group C spec BMW 635 CSi in the 1983 James Hardie 1000 at Bathurst. After Richards qualified the car in a brilliant 4th place in Hardies Heroes, the black and gold BMW was suddenly seen as a dark horse for the race. However, race day was a disaster for the team. On lap 3 the BMW suddenly slowed and Richards headed for the pits where the team found metal filings in the fuel system. The car only did another 4 laps before being retired from the race. Gardner would later claim that he believed the car had been sabotaged although he did not know by who and wouldn't speculate on the reason, though the car not being Australian made and its cigarette sponsorship were popular theories at the time. However, as the cigarette sponsored Holden Dealer Team (Marlboro) and Allan Moffat's Mazda team (Peter Stuyvesant) who finished Bathurst in first and second respectively were not targeted, some felt the car being European was a more likely reason. At the time, the long-held Holden and Ford V8 domination of Group C touring car racing in Australia was under serious threat with factory-backed teams from foreign manufacturers the likes of the European BMW, and Japanese marques Mazda and Nissan, and this was unpopular with not only the fans, but some within the sport itself. The claim of sabotage is actually disputed by Jim Richards and the team's chief mechanic Pip Baker who believe that the dirty fuel could have been a combination of things.

Following the 1983 Bathurst 1000, Gardner was not only the team manager but also the main test driver for JPS Team BMW. This was because the team itself was based in Sydney (doing almost all of its testing at Amaroo Park) while the team's drivers Richards and (from 1984) Tony Longhurst lived in Melbourne and on the Gold Coast respectively. It is estimated that Gardner completed more time driving the various 635 CSi's and M3's than either Richards or Longhurst.

Following his sudden retirement at the end of 1987, JPS Team BMW was replaced as BMW Australia's team by Peter Brock's former Holden Dealer Team operation, although that relationship ended after a single season in which the BMW M3 had become uncompetitive against the increasingly powerful and numerous Sierra's. During his time as leader of JPS Team BMW, the team won the 1985 and 1987 Australian Touring Car Championships with Jim Richards, driving first a 635 CSi and then an M3. Richards also won the 1985 and 1986 Australian Endurance Championships as well as the 1985 AMSCAR Series at Amaroo Park while Longhurst won the AMSCAR in 1986 and 1987. Richards and Longhurst also teamed to win the 1985 Castrol 500 at Sandown Raceway in the 635 CSi with their teammates Neville Crichton and on-loan Nissan driver George Fury finishing 2nd.

JPS team driver Tony Longhurst decided to form his own team, which became known as LoGaMo Racing, for 1988, running a Ford Sierra RS500, with Gardner acting as a 'consultant', although it was generally accepted that he and Longhurst shared the team manager duties. Gardner finally won the Bathurst 1000 in 1988 when Longhurst and Tomas Mezera won in their Benson & Hedges sponsored Sierra. The team continued to run the Fords through 1989 and 1990. During 1990 it was generally believed that the Benson & Hedges Sierra's were the fastest and most powerful Group A touring cars in the world. Unfortunately for the Gardner-led team, race results weren't as forthcoming with the only wins being in 1988 and later in the Amaroo Park based AMSCAR series.

When BMW returned to the Australian championship in 1991 with its upgraded BMW M3 Evolution model, it was with Longhurst Racing with Gardner at the helm with  Formula One World Champion Alan Jones driving the team's 2nd car. The factory BMW team continued with Gardner at the helm until 1998 (switching to Supertouring cars in 1994), winning the 1994 (with Longhurst), 1995 and 1997 (with Paul Morris) Super Touring titles.

Other activities
Gardner had a passion for road driver training and had commenced to do that at Bob Jane's Calder Race Track in Melbourne.  In 1990 he founded his own Performance Driving Centre between Brisbane and the Gold Coast in Queensland and was awarded the Order of Australia (the equivalent of a knighthood in the UK) for his services to motor racing. Before taking up motor racing he had been an unbeaten boxer and champion surf life saver (he was Captain of the Whale Beach Surf Life Saving Club in Sydney and also participated in South Africa). Gardner reportedly could have also been a professional golfer and was also a motorcycle racer.

Gardner was an intelligent engineer as well as an accomplished racing driver, which helped him in both his racing career and as a team owner and manager. He was also a brilliant public speaker and could hold a crowd with his fund of hilarious and often risque stories about his own experiences and other drivers and characters within motor racing.

In 1973 Patrick Stephens Ltd., published a book penned by Gardner entitled "Racing Drivers Manual" in collaboration with Castrol Oils Ltd. This book was a mixture of useful advice for the budding racing driver punctuated by Gardner's autobiographical recollections of his early life and many racing experiences.

In 1980, Gardner published a book titled Drive to Survive. It is still in print 25 years later.

Death
Gardner, who had raced during an era when safety wasn't a big concern for the drivers and where many of his fellow drivers (including a number of close friends such as World Champion Jim Clark) were killed in racing accidents, had always maintained that he didn't care if he wasn't the fastest driver, he just wanted to be the oldest. He died in his home at Mermaid Waters in Queensland on 29 August 2009 at the age of 78 following a long battle with illness associated with his racing and engineering career.

He left behind his former model wife Gloria and a son and daughter.

Career results
A summary of some of Gardner's motor racing achievements:

Complete 24 Hours of Le Mans results

Complete British Saloon Car Championship results
(key) (Races in bold indicate pole position; races in italics indicate fastest lap.)

† Events with 2 races staged for the different classes.

Complete Tasman Series results

Complete Formula One World Championship results
(key)

Formula One Non-Championship results
(key)

Complete European Formula Two Championship results
(key) (Races in bold indicate pole position; races in italics indicate fastest lap)

Complete European F5000 Championship results
(key) (note: results shown in bold indicate pole position; results in italics indicate fastest lap)

Complete Bathurst 500/1000 results

References

1931 births
2009 deaths
Australian Formula One drivers
European Formula Two Championship drivers
British Touring Car Championship drivers
British Touring Car Championship Champions
Australian Touring Car Championship drivers
24 Hours of Le Mans drivers
12 Hours of Reims drivers
World Sportscar Championship drivers
Tasman Series drivers
Recipients of the Medal of the Order of Australia
Bernard White Racing Formula One drivers
Racing drivers from Sydney
Sportspeople from the Gold Coast, Queensland